Code Project (formerly The Code Project) is a community for computer programmers with articles on different topics and programming languages such as web development, software development, C++, Java, and other topics. Once a visitor registers a user account on the site, they can gain reputation which allows users to unlock different privileges such as the ability to store personal files in the user's account area, have live hyperlinks in their profile biography, and more. Members can also write and upload their own articles and code for other visitors to view.

Articles can be related to general programming, GUI design, algorithms or collaboration. Most of the articles are uploaded by visitors and do not come from an external source. Nearly every article is accompanied with source code and examples which can be downloaded independently. Most articles and sources are released under the Code Project Open License (CPOL), although the license can be configured by the user. These articles either go through a moderation and editing phase or are immediately posted as unedited reader contributions.

Code Project employs a rating and comment system that helps to filter the good articles from the poor. It also has forums, and is a resource for resolving difficult software development issues.

Rather than being just a collection of samples, contributors are encouraged to explain concepts and ideas, and discuss design decisions. A separate format, "Tips and Tricks", was introduced in 2010 as a place to post short code snippets that don't fit the requirements for an article.

Code Project strives to be a wealth of information and a valuable resource. The site encourages users to share what source code or knowledge they can in order to give back to the community.

Code Project also conducts interviews with notable developers.  Code Project also awards Code Project Members Choice Awards in various categories. These awards are based on the votes of Code Project members and editors, reflecting which companies and products application developers value most.

Users may also be awarded MVP status with Code Project, which is presented to a small handful of people. Code Project's Most Valuable Professional award is given to those members who have contributed the most to the community in both article submissions and in answering questions on the site. The award is given annually.

Community
There are non-programming forums, where members can discuss news and sporting events, or comment on the latest thread.  There is a high volume of posts to these, mainly in 'The Lounge'. They hit the 10-million-member mark in August 2013.

Languages
Code Project contains articles and code pertaining to the following programming languages:
C/C++ (emphasis on Microsoft Foundation Classes, but many other domains are dealt with)
C#
VB.NET
ASP
JavaScript
Common Lisp
Ajax
SQL
Delphi
Java
Perl
Python

Topics 
Code Project contains articles pertaining to the following topics:
 Android
 iOS
 Internet of Things
 Web Development
 Programming
 Mobile Development
 Graphics

See also
 Code Project Open License

References

External links
 

Software developer communities
Community websites
Free software websites